The Hobie 33 is an American trailerable sailboat that was designed by Hobie Alter and Phil Edwards as one-design racer and first built in 1982. It was the first monohull design for Alter and his company, after establishing their reputations for their lines of surfboards and catamarans

Production
The design was built by Hobie Cat in the United States from 1982 until 1987, with 187 examples completed, but it is now out of production.

Design
The Hobie 33 is a recreational keelboat, built predominantly of a polyester and fiberglass sandwich, with wood trim. It displaces  and carries  of lead ballast.

It mast is hinged at the mast step and the spinnaker pole is used to raise the mast for quick launching with a small crew.

The boat is normally fitted with a small outboard motor for docking and maneuvering. The outboard is fitted into a stern well, that allows the motor to be swung up and a hatch closed to fair the opening.

The galley is limited to a dish locker, an icebox under the companionway steps and provisions for an optional alcohol-fired stove. There is a sink fed by pumped water, vanity and space for a portable-type head to be installed. Sleeping accommodations are provided for five people on a bow "V"-berth, two under-cockpit single berths and one main cabin settee berth.

There are six port fixed lights in a tapered shape and a forward acrylic plastic hatch for ventilation.

The cockpit has two sheet winches and all lines, including the halyards, lead to the cockpit. A  spinnaker can be used for downwind sailing. The genoa employs a headfoil (a headsail airfoil-shaped reinforcement) and a concealed backstay adjuster. The mainsheet and the boom vang both have 4:1 mechanical advantages. There is a topping lift and an internal outhaul line.

Operational history
In a 1994 review, Richard Sherwood, described the boat, "This boat is Hobie Alter’s first venture into monohulls and off-shore boats. She is ultra-light-displacement and designed for one-design racing, but will sleep two couples. The 33 tends to sail well heeled. The narrow beam is required so the boat can be trailered. The keel is lifted for trailering, and it is bolted down for sailing."

See also
List of sailing boat types

Similar sailboats
C&C 3/4 Ton
C&C SR 33
DB-1
DB-2
San Juan 33S
Tartan Ten

References

Keelboats
1980s sailboat type designs
Sailing yachts
Trailer sailers
Sailboat type designs by Hobie Alter
Sailboat type designs by Phil Edwards
Sailboat types built by Hobie Cat